Arenicella is a genus of bacteria from the class Gammaproteobacteria.

References

Alteromonadales
Bacteria genera